Elections to the Baseball Hall of Fame for 1988 followed the system in place since 1978. 
The Baseball Writers' Association of America (BBWAA) voted by mail to select from recent major league players and 
elected Willie Stargell. The Veterans Committee met in closed sessions to consider older major league players as well as managers, umpires, executives, and figures from the Negro leagues; it selected no one. A formal induction ceremony was held in Cooperstown, New York, on July 31, 1988, with Commissioner of Baseball Peter Ueberroth in attendance.

BBWAA election
The BBWAA was authorized to elect players active in 1968 or later, but not after 1982; the ballot included candidates from the 1987 ballot who received at least 5% of the vote but were not elected, along with selected players, chosen by a screening committee, whose last appearance was in 1982. All 10-year members of the BBWAA were eligible to vote.

Voters were instructed to cast votes for up to 10 candidates; any candidate receiving votes on at least 75% of the ballots would be honored with induction to the Hall. The ballot consisted of 44 players; a total of 427 ballots were cast, with 321 votes required for election. A total of 2,819 individual votes were cast, an average of 6.60 per ballot. Those candidates receiving less than 5% of the vote will not appear on future BBWAA ballots, but may eventually be considered by the Veterans Committee.

Candidates who were eligible for the first time are indicated here with a dagger (†). The candidate who received at least 75% of the vote and was elected is indicated in bold italics; candidates who have since been elected in subsequent elections are indicated in italics. The 20 candidates who received less than 5% of the vote, thus becoming ineligible for future BBWAA consideration, are indicated with an asterisk (*).

Roger Maris, Elston Howard and Don Larsen were on the ballot for the 15th and final time.

The newly-eligible players included 21 All-Stars, two of whom were not included on the ballot, representing a total of 44 All-Star selections. Among the new candidates were 7-time All-Stars Willie Stargell and Reggie Smith, who were the only candidates to have been selected at least five times. The field included one MVP (Stargell), two Cy Young Award-winners (Randy Jones and Sparky Lyle) and one Rookie of the Year (Stan Bahnsen).

Players eligible for the first time who were not included on the ballot were: John D'Acquisto, Barry Foote, Tom Griffin, Mick Kelleher, Len Randle, Ken Reitz, Dave Roberts, Eddie Solomon, Don Stanhouse, Fred Stanley, and Frank Taveras.

J. G. Taylor Spink Award 
Jim Murray (1919–1998) received the J. G. Taylor Spink Award honoring a baseball writer. The award was voted at the December 1987 meeting of the BBWAA, and included in the summer 1988 ceremonies.

References

External links
1988 Election at www.baseballhalloffame.org

Baseball Hall of Fame balloting
Hall of Fame balloting